Toprak-Kala, in modern Karakalpakstan, Uzbekistan, was an ancient palace city and the capital of in Chorasmia in the 2nd/3rd century CE, where wall paintings, coins and archives were discovered. Its history covers a period from the 1st to the 5th century CE. It is part of the "Fifty fortresses oasis" in modern-day Uzbekistan.

Toprak-Kala palace city
Toprak-Kala appears to have been built by Artav (Artabanos), ruler of Khwarezm, in the 1st or 2nd century CE. The establishment of Toprak-Kala probably followed the abandonment of Akchakhan-Kala, 14 km to the southwest.

The ruins of the city were explored by the Chorasmian Expedition under the guidance of Sergey Tolstov in 1938. The date of the palace has been determined by the discovery of coins of the Kushan Empire rulers Vima Kadphises and Kanishka, as well as coins of the Khwarazmian king Artav (Artabanus). Wall paintings representing Zoroastrian deities were discovered in the Palace. 

Toprak-kala and the whole of Chorasmia seem to have been under the control of the Kushan Empire for some time during the 2nd century CE, as coins of Vima Kadphises and Kanishka were found, interrupting a series of coins of Chorasmian rulers before and after them. Others have analysed the coinage evidence as indicating that the Kushan did not control Khwarezm.

Several high-reliefs of standing figures drapped in robes of Hellenistic style, which are thought to derive from the style of the Greco-Buddhist art of Gandhara, reflecting the influence of the Kushan Empire, were discovered in the ruins of Toprak-Kala. This abundant sculptural work may also have been accomplished by artisans from nearby Bactria, where a Hellenistic tradition remained active since the time of the Greco-Bactrian kingdom. The statues are now located in the Hermitage Museum in Saint-Petersburg.

Sergey Tolstov drew a reconstruction of the ancient city.

Nearby Kyzyl-Kala fortress

The small fortress of Kyzyl-Kala, also "Qyzyl Qala" ("Red fortress") is located nearby, 1 km to the west, and was also built in the 1st-4th century CE, possibly as a fortified defense for the site of Toprak-Kala.

Kyzyl-Kala was once restored in the 12th century CE. It has also been the subject of a modern renovation program, with the objective of showing what a fortress looked like originally.

Related sites
Toprak-Kala is somewhat related to another archaeological site 30 km to the southeast, Koi Krylgan Kala, another major component of the "Fifty fortresses oasis". Another related site is Ayaz-Kala.

The location of the Chorasmian capital was changed to Kyat (modern Beruniy), at the time of the Afrighid dynasty sometime after 305 CE, but the town of Toprak-Kala continued to prosper until the 6th century CE.

References

External links
 Excavations at Toprak-Kala

Central Asia
Archaeology of Iran
Archaeological sites in Uzbekistan
Former populated places in Uzbekistan
Kushan Empire